The New Brunswick Legislature is the legislature of the province of New Brunswick, Canada. Today, the legislature is made of two elements: the lieutenant governor of New Brunswick, and the unicameral assembly called the Legislative Assembly of New Brunswick. The legislature has existed de jure since New Brunswick separated from Nova Scotia in 1784, but was not first convened until 1786.

Like the Canadian federal government, New Brunswick uses a Westminster-style system, in which members are sent to the Legislative Assembly after general elections. Usually the leader of the party with the most seats is asked by the lieutenant governor to form a government who then becomes Premier of New Brunswick and appoints an Executive Council of New Brunswick. The premier is New Brunswick's head of government, while the lieutenant governor represents Canada's head of state Charles III, King of Canada.

The legislature was originally bicameral, with an upper house called the Legislative Council of New Brunswick. The upper house was abolished in 1892.

List of Legislatures
Following is a list of the 58 times the legislature has been convened since 1786.

References